The Rossi Bridge over Wollondilly River is a heritage-listed road bridge that carries Range Road across the Wollondilly River, Goulburn, New South Wales, Australia. The bridge is owned by Transport for NSW. It is also known as Rossi's Crossing. It was added to the New South Wales State Heritage Register on 20 June 2000.

History 
Rossi's Crossing was a ford over the Wollondilly River used by the locals for access north west of Goulburn towards Wheeo and Crookwell. Built near the estate of F. R. L. Rossi, a well known local, near his estate, Rossiville. G. J. Clarke built the approaches.

At some stage a bridge had been built, meetings being held, but it was in disrepair as early as 1873 needing repairs by Government tender; and again in 1887, and in 1893.

Tenders for the new super structure were called in 1898. The bridge over the Wollondilly River at Rossi's Crossing was re-built in 1898-99. The contractors were J. J. Taylor and H. F. Littleproud of Bega, who had submitted a tender of A£2,545 17s 5d.

Description 
The bridge is a good example of the  Allan truss  span bridge. This type was developed in 1893 and used at least until 1920. It is a [Howe-type bridge and has a number of design features. It has tension rods for verticals and these can be used to adjust the geometry and counteract shrinkage; the diagonal members were cut off square at their ends and pressed against special cast iron details and double timbers were used to allow for replacement. This bridge is unusual for its type in that it has granite piers and abutments, said to date from 1860 or earlier. The bridge was early for its type, and its design and span give it considerable technological significance.

The Rossi Bridge is a large scale example of an Allan composite timber truss bridge. The bridge is unusual because of its support by elegant masonry piers (which have not been noted under any other truss bridge in New South Wales). The truss structure and piers complement an already attractive rural landscape.

Heritage listing 
The Rossi Bridge over the Wollondilly River was listed on the New South Wales State Heritage Register on 20 June 2000.

See also 

 List of bridges in Australia

References

Attribution

External links

1899 establishments in Australia
Allan truss bridges
Articles incorporating text from the New South Wales State Heritage Register
Bridges completed in 1899
Buildings and structures in Goulburn, New South Wales
New South Wales State Heritage Register
Road bridges in New South Wales
Wooden bridges in Australia